The Front for the Defence of Constitutional Institutions (or simply FDIC) was a Moroccan political party founded in 1963 by Ahmed Reda Guedira, friend and advisor of King Hassan II.

History 
The FDIC was created some months after the declaration of the Constitution of Morocco. A strong royalist, Ahmed Reda Guedira founded the FDIC for hinder the hegemony of the two strong parties: the conservative Istiqlal Party and the socialist National Union of Popular Forces.

The FDIC won the 1963 elections, and his candidate Ahmed Bahnini became Prime Minister in a FDIC-Istiqlal alliance, that ruled the Morocco for two years, and was succeeded, ironically for a royalist party, by the King Hassan II's govern.
Only in 1967, the party established another government under Mohamed Benhima, that collapsed in 1969.

However, as a centrist party with a weak structuration, the FDIC was dissolved around 1970, merged in the Popular Movement.

Electoral results

Moroccan Parliament

References 

Political parties established in 1963
Monarchist parties
Liberal parties in Morocco
1963 establishments in Morocco